The prokaryotic phospholipase A2 domain is found in bacterial and fungal phospholipases. It enables the liberation of fatty acids and lysophospholipid by hydrolyzing the 2-ester bond of 1,2-diacyl-3-sn-phosphoglycerides. The domain adopts an alpha-helical secondary structure, consisting of five alpha-helices and two helical segments.

References

Protein domains
Peripheral membrane proteins